Charlotte Fielden (June 5, 1932 - February 20, 2021) was a Canadian novelist, playwright, actress and poet. She was a retired therapist.

Born in Toronto, Ontario, Fielden studied mime with Marcel Marceau in the 1950s, and was featured in the Stratford Festival of Canada with actors such as William Shatner. She has written for stage, television, radio, and film, and her short stories, articles and poetry have been included in various anthologies, literary reviews and news publications. She provided the English dubbed versions for Claude Jutra's films Mon Oncle Antoine and Kamouraska.

After retirement, Fielden returned to writing and publishing with 'Palatine Hill', a historical novel (2004) that spans over three hundred years of Canadian history, focusing on the Secord family, and centering on Niagara-on-the-Lake and the War of 1812.

A Thin Place, a short story collection was published in 2006, and takes readers through the thin veil of reality where it becomes surreal.

An Age Without A Name, released in the fall of 2007, concludes the Weil Trilogy.  Preceded by Crying As She Ran, and Messages Like Memories, it spans 100 years of a Toronto immigrant family from 1920 to 2020.  A Fragrance of Thyme, her first poetry collection, was released in June 2008, and her first mystery novel, The Wolves of Positano had a July 2010 release.

Fielden's published play in two acts, Saving Angel had successful staged readings in Toronto (August 2006) and in London, England at the Actors Centre (2006). 
Fielden was also working with composer Ian McAndrew on their musical Storyville.

Fielden's tenth book and second poetry collection, Beads on a Fragile String had a February 2011 release, and The Story of Marly Mansion, another psychological thriller, sequel to The Wolves of Positano, had a 2012 September release. 'Travelling Together' a contemporary fable, about tree conservation and a man and a tree travelling life's journey together, and about a woman on a healing journey, had a May 2013 release. Fielden's thirteenth book, "The Somerset Strangler" another psychological thriller and a sequel to "The Story of Marly Mansion" had its release in May 2014. 
"Beholder", Fielden's fourteenth book and third poetry collection had its release in March 2015. In "Beholder" she ventures into both the luminous and the shadow areas of creation and the human condition. The poems span the years 2011, 2012, 2013, and 2014.
And Ross Castle Murders, the fourth book in the mystery series, Fielden's fifteenth book had an October 2016 release. It takes place in Ireland and centers on badger-baiting and blood-sports as well as cruelty to domestic animals. 
A special mention goes to Fielden's award-winning son musician Jerry Fielden, lead guitarist of the Canadian Metal band AraPacis, who is also her editor, and recipient of the Queen Elizabeth II Diamond Jubilee Medal, (October 2012) for his book on the Wildcats, the 438 Tactical Helicopter Squadron of the RCAF.

Fielden’s sixteenth and last published book, "Who Will Remember?," was about a group of seniors who participate in a clinical trial for Alzheimer’s in Mexico and find unexpected challenges, rewards, and fulfillment.

Fielden was a founding member of both the Writers' Union of Canada and the Playwrights Guild of Canada.

Bibliography
 Crying As She Ran - Macmillan of Canada, 1970
 One Crowded Hour - Playwrights' Co-op, 1976 (First Prize, the Women's National Playwriting Competition)
 Palatine Hill - CFM Books, 2004
 Messages Like Memories - CFM Books, 2005
 A Thin Place - CFM Books, 2006
 Saving Angel, a play - CFM Books, 2007
 An Age Without a Name - CFM Books, 2007
 Fragrance of Thyme - CFM Books, 2008
 The Wolves of Positano - CFM Books, 2010
 Beads on a Fragile String - CFM Books, 2011
 The story of Marly Mansion - CFM Books, 2012
 Travelling Together - CFM Books, 2013
 The Somerset Strangler - CFM Books, 2014
 Beholder - CFM Books, 2015
 Ross Castle Murders - CFM Books, 2016
 Who Will Remember? - CFM Books, 2018

External links
 Charlotte Fielden web site

1932 births
2021 deaths
Canadian women novelists
Canadian women poets
20th-century Canadian actresses